Matthew Adams may refer to:

Buddy Matthews (born 1988), born Matthew Adams, Australian professional wrestler 
Matthew Algernon Adams (1836–1913), British doctor
Matt Adams (born 1988), American baseball player
Matt Adams (umpire), Australian rules football umpire
Matthew Adams (American football) (born 1995), American football linebacker
Matthew J. Adams, American archaeologist